Singhu is a village in the North West Delhi district of the National Capital Region (India).

It borders the Haryana state, and became popular during the Indian farmers protest of 2020/2021 when the Indian government erected walls to prevent Haryana protestors from reaching Delhi. As of 21 March 2021, according to Haryana Police, there were around 18,000-19,000 committed protestors sitting at Singhu at the Delhi border.

A lynching took place in the area in October 2021, with the body of the victim being hung on a barricade near the protest site.

References

External links 
 Survey Report on Village Sanghu by Directorate of Census Operations, Delhi

Villages in North West Delhi district